Literary Kicks is a website that functions as a digital library of poetry and prose, biography and cultural criticism chiefly focused on Beat Generation writers. Founded in 1994 by Levi Asher, the site has since expanded to cover a wider range of literary genres, from ancient literature to contemporary fiction and poetry, and hosts literary discussions, poetry boards, workshops and a digital library of articles, resources and texts.  

Since 1996 Literary Kicks has hosted poetry readings in New York City and other venues across the United States. In 1998 LitKicks Publishing was created. The first LitKicks publication was a digital video, Notes from Underground, based on Fyodor Dostoevsky's story of the same name, followed by a community-generated poetry anthology in 2004, Action Poetry, which was nominated for a Blooker Prize. Other notable events include: The QUEST writing tournament (October 2003), the 24 Hour Poetry Party (July 2004) and October Earth (October 2004).

External links
 LitKicks Publishing

Discipline-oriented digital libraries
American literature websites
American digital libraries